Seychelles is a small island country located in the Sea of Zanj due north of Madagascar, with Antsiranana as its nearest foreign city. Seychelles lies between approximately 4ºS and 10ºS and 46ºE and 54ºE. The nation is an archipelago of 115 tropical islands, some granite and some coral. the majority of which are small and uninhabited. About 90 percent of the population of 90,000 live on Mahé, 9 percent on Praslin and La Digue. Around a third of the land area is the island of Mahé and a further third the atoll of Aldabra.

There are two distinct regions, the granitic islands, the world's only oceanic islands of granitic rock and the coralline outer islands. The granite islands are the world's oldest ocean islands, while the outer islands are mainly very young, though the Aldabra group and St Pierre (Farquhar Group) are unusual, raised coral islands that have emerged and submerged several times during their long history, the most recent submergence dating from about 125,000 years ago

Physical features
Some forty islands are granitic and lie in a  radius from Mahé, the main island. The remaining islands are coralline, stretching over a  radius from Ile Aux Vaches in the northeast to the Aldabra Atoll in the southwest. The country's Inner Islands are the granitic islands plus two nearby coralline islands, Bird Island and Denis Island. The remaining coralline islands are the Outer Islands. The islands are all small—the aggregate land area is only .

It contains the capital and only city, Victoria, an excellent port. The only other important islands by virtue of their size and population are Praslin and La Digue, situated about thirty kilometers to the northeast of Mahé.

The granitic islands are the peaks of the submarine Mascarene Plateau, a continental formation theorized to be either a part of Africa separated when Asia began to drift away from the original single continent of Gondwana, or the remnants of a microcontinent that existed up to the beginning of the Tertiary Period, approximately 50 million years ago. The granitic islands are characterized by boulder-covered hills and mountains as high as  rising abruptly from the sea. Elsewhere, narrow coastal plains extend to the base of the foothills. Extensively developed coral reefs are found mainly on the east coasts because of the southwest trade winds and equatorial current. Ninety-nine percent of the population is located on the granitic islands, and most are on Mahé.

The coralline islands differ sharply from the granitic in that they are very flat, often rising only a few feet (one meter) above sea level. They have no fresh water, and very few have a resident population. Many, like Ile aux Vaches, Ile Denis, the Amirante Isles, Platte Island, and Coetivy Island, are sand cays upon which extensive coconut plantations have been established. Some of the coralline islands consist of uplifted reefs and atolls covered with stunted vegetation. Several of these islands have been important breeding grounds for turtles and birds, as well as the sites of extensive guano deposits, which formerly constituted an important element of the Seychellois economy but now for the most part are depleted. The Aldabra Islands, the largest coralline atoll with an area greater than Mahe, are a sanctuary for rare animals and birds.

The five groups of coralline islands that make up the Outer Islands are Southern Coral Group (a collective term for Île Platte and Coëtivy Island), Amirante Islands, Alphonse Group (Alphonse Atoll and St. François Atoll), Aldabra Group (Aldabra Atoll, Assumption Island, and the Cosmoledo Group, consisting of Cosmoledo Atoll and Astove Island), and Farquhar Group (Farquhar Atoll, Providence Atoll and St. Pierre Island).

Geology

The Seychelles is part of the granitic Mascarene Plateau which broke off from the Indian Plate about 66 mya. This rift formation is associated with the Réunion hotspot which is also responsible for Réunion Island and the Deccan Traps in India. Because of its long isolation, the Seychelles hosts several unique species including the coco de mer, a palm which has the largest seeds of any plant and the world's largest population of giant tortoises.

Climate

The climate of Seychelles is tropical, having little seasonal variation. Temperatures on Mahe rarely rise above  or drop below . Humidity is high, but its enervating effect is usually ameliorated by prevailing winds. The southeast monsoon from late May to September brings cooler weather, and the northwest monsoon from March to May, warmer weather. 

High winds are rare inasmuch as most islands lie outside the Indian Ocean cyclone belt; Mahe suffered the only such storm in its recorded history in 1862.

Because catchment provides most sources of water in Seychelles, yearly variations in rainfall or even brief periods of drought can produce water shortages. Small dams have been built on Mahe since 1969 in an effort to guarantee a reliable water supply, but drought can still be a problem on Mahe and particularly on La Digue.

Flora and fauna

The Seychelles contain at least 75 species of flowering plants, three mammal species, 15 bird species, 30 species of reptiles and amphibians, and several hundred species of snails, insects, spiders and other invertebrates found nowhere else. The diversity of species in the islands is being assessed by the Nature Protection Trust of Seychelles. In addition, the waters contain more than 900 kinds of fish, of which more than one-third are associated with coral reefs. Specific examples of unique birds are the black paradise flycatcher, the black parrot, the brush warbler, and a flightless rail. Most famous of all the Seychelles animals are the giant tortoises of the genus Aldabrachelys.

Environmental threats
As a result of extensive shipping to Seychelles that brings needed imports and the discharge of commercial tuna fishing, the waters suffer some pollution. Furthermore, goats brought to Aldabra Islands are destroying much of the vegetation on which giant tortoises feed or seek shade. Rats have reduced biodiversity on many islands. Climate change is also a significant issue; it was recently realised that this has caused the extinction of the endemic snail Rhachistia aldabrae.

Seychelles began addressing the conservation problem in the late 1960s by creating the Nature Conservancy Commission, later renamed the Seychelles National Environment Commission. Legislation protects wildlife and bans various destructive practices.

A major project has been funded by Fonds Francais pour l'environnement Mondiale (FFEM) and implemented by Island Conservation Society. This aims to rehabilitate and enhance islands for the maintenance of native biodiversity in Seychelles through eradication of introduced predator species, rehabilitation of habitats and reintroduction of rare or threatened species. Rats have been eliminated from North Island under this project and more schemes are planned, including at Cosmoledo Atoll and on Conception Island.

Facts and figures

Geographic coordinates: 

Area:
total:
459 km2
land:
459 km2
water:
0 km2

Land boundaries:
0 km

Coastline:
491 km

Maritime claims:
continental shelf:
 or to the edge of the continental margin
exclusive economic zone:
 with 
territorial sea:

Elevation extremes:
lowest point:
Indian Ocean 0 m
highest point:
Morne Seychellois 905 m

Natural resources:
fish, copra, cinnamon trees

Land use:
arable land:
2%
permanent crops:
13%
permanent pastures:
0%
forests and woodland:
11%
other:
74% (1993 est.)

Irrigated land:
0 km2

Environment - international agreements:
party to:
Biodiversity, Climate Change, Desertification, Endangered Species, Hazardous Wastes, Law of the Sea, Marine Dumping, Nuclear Test Ban, Ozone Layer Protection, Ship Pollution, Whaling
signed, but not ratified:
Climate Change-Kyoto Protocol

Table of Islands

Extreme points 
This is a list of the extreme points of Seychelles, the points that are farther north, south, east or west than any other location.

 Northernmost point – Bird Island, Outer Islands district
 Easternmost point – Coëtivy Island, Outer Islands district
 Southernmost point - Goelette Island, Farquhar Group, Outer Islands district
 Westernmost point -  West Island, Aldabra Islands, Outer Islands district

See also

Seychelles Plate
Mascarene Plateau

Notes

References

 
S
S